John Hendy, Baron Hendy,  (born 11 April 1948) is an English barrister and politician practising in employment and trade union law.

Legal career
Once qualified as a barrister, Hendy established a law centre, the Newham Rights Centre in East London, and worked there full-time for three years. He then lectured for a year at Middlesex Polytechnic, before returning to the Bar in 1977 and focusing on personal injury and industrial relations cases.

In the mid-1980s, he successfully represented Wendy Savage, a consultant obstetrician and  gynecologist who was suspended from practice for alleged incompetence. The case led to him working on others in the area of medical negligence, discipline and ethics.

In 1984–5, he represented the National Union of Mineworkers in the civil litigation arising out of the Miners' Strike. He took silk in 1987. In 1991, he was one of four QCs, along with Michael Mansfield, Geoffrey Robertson and Kevin Garnett, acting for the National Union of Mineworkers against claims that they had handled funds inappropriately during the miner's strike of 1984–85. In 1992 he represented mining unions at the High Court against attempts to close 31 coal mines.

In 1995, he acted for National Union of Journalists (NUJ) member Dave Wilson in the Wilson and Palmer v United Kingdom case that ended discrimination against trade unionists.

In April 1999, Hendy became head of Old Square Chambers, in succession to John Melville Williams. By that year, judgments in 76 of his cases had been published in law reports.

Hendy is well known for representing the relatives of the victims of the Ladbroke Grove and Southall rail accidents.

He retired as head of Old Square Chambers in 2009.

In 2011, The Lawyer described him as the "barrister champion of the trade union movement", noting that he often assists Unite, ASLEF and the National Union of Rail, Maritime and Transport Workers

He represented the NUJ at the Leveson Inquiry and questioned Rupert Murdoch directly on 27 March 2012.

House of Lords
Hendy was nominated for a life peerage in the 2019 Prime Minister's Resignation Honours. He was created Baron Hendy, of Hayes and Harlington in the London Borough of Hillingdon, on 15 October 2019. He sits as a Labour peer in the House of Lords. He made his maiden speech on 31 October 2019 during the Lords consideration of the Phase 1 Report of the Grenfell Tower Inquiry.

Personal
His maternal grandfather held an hereditary peerage: he the 6th Baron Wynford. Hendy’s father was "a communist electrician and trade unionist". He describes his father as "a great fighter for human dignity as a trade unionist" and as being the greatest influence on his life. His brother is Peter Hendy, Baron Hendy of Richmond Hill CBE, who was Commissioner of Transport for London from 2006 until 2015 and is now Chairman of Network Rail.

See also
A Manifesto for Labour Law (2016)

Notes

English barristers
Living people
1948 births
Labour Party (UK) life peers
Life peers created by Elizabeth II